Isaac Morales (born December 29, 1983) is a former American football offensive lineman who is currently a varsity offensive line football coach at Allen D. Nease High School. He played guard for the University of Wyoming.

Professional career

Jacksonville Sharks
He was signed as an undrafted free agent by the Jacksonville Sharks in 2010. On May 10, 2012, Morales returned to the Sharks.

Portland Thunder
On December 20, 2013, Morales was selected by the Portland Thunder during the 2014 AFL Expansion Draft.

Return to Jacksonville
On May 15, 2014, Morales was assigned to the Sharks.

References

External links
 Jacksonville Sharks Bio

1983 births
Living people
American football offensive guards
American football defensive linemen
Wyoming Cowboys football players
University of Wyoming alumni
Arkansas Twisters players
Jacksonville Sharks players
People from Canyon, Texas
Players of American football from Texas
Portland Thunder players